The Hit Parade is a 1937 American musical film directed by Gus Meins and written by Bradford Ropes, Samuel Ornitz and Harry Ruskin. The film stars Frances Langford, Phil Regan, Max Terhune, Edward Brophy, Louise Henry and Pert Kelton. The film was released on April 26, 1937, by Republic Pictures.  Republic later reissued the film in 67 minute length as I'll Reach for a Star.

Plot
The plot follows Pete Garland as he gets fired by singer Monica Barrett, and out of spite finds Ruth Allison and decides to make her a star, he succeeds, but Ruth has some dark secrets.

Cast
Frances Langford as Ruth Allison 
Phil Regan as Pete Garland
Max Terhune as Rusty Callahan
Edward Brophy as Mulrooney
Louise Henry as Monica Barrett
Pert Kelton as Eadie White
Pierre Watkin as J. B. Hawley
J. Farrell MacDonald as Sgt. O'Hara
Monroe Owsley as Teddy Leeds
Inez Courtney as Tillie
William Demarest as Parole Officer
George Givot as Herman
Sammy White as Dancer
Paul Garner as Member, The Gentle Maniacs 
Sam Wolfe as Member, The Gentle Maniacs
Richard Hakins as Member, The Gentle Maniacs
Yvonne Manoff as Member, The Tic Toc Girls
Mildred Winston as Member, The Tic Toc Girls
Barbara Johnston as Member, The Tic Toc Girls
Carl Hoff as Bandleader of 'The Hit Parade Orchester'
Ivie Anderson as Ivy 
Duke Ellington as Duke Ellington
Eddy Duchin as Eddy Duchin
Pat Padgett as Pat of Pick and Pat / Molasses of Molasses and January
Pick Malone as Pick of Pick and Pat / January of Molasses and January
Al Pearce as Al Pearce
Sayle Taylor as The Voice of Experience
Ed Thorgersen as Ed Thorgersen
Ed 'Oscar' Platt as Oscar
Lou Fulton as Elmer 
Arlene Harris as Arlene 'Chatterbox' Harris
Stanley Fields as Bedtime Story Man

Soundtrack 
Happy Days Are Here Again 
Music by Milton Ager
Lyrics by Jack Yellen
Performed by Carl Hoff & The Hit Parade Orchestra
I've Got to Be a Rug Cutter 
Written by Duke Ellington
Performed by Ivie Anderson and the Duke Ellington Orchestra
If It Wasn't for Pete 
Music by Sam H. Stept 
Lyrics by Ned Washington
Sung by Sammy White 
Danced by Sammy White with chorus
The Glory Beyond 
Music by Alberto Colombo
Danced by Frances Langford and Pert Kelton
I'll Reach for a Star
Music by Lou Handman
Lyrics by Walter Hirsch
Sung by Frances Langford
 Sweet Heartache
Music by Sam H. Stept
Lyrics by Ned Washington
Sung by Phil Regan
Reprised by Frances Langford
Last Night I Dreamed of You
Music by Lou Handman
Lyrics by Walter Hirsch
Sung by Frances Langford
 Geschichten aus dem Wienerwald/Wiener Blut - Medley
Music by Johann Strauss
Arranged by Eddy Duchin
played by Eddy Duchin and His Orchestra
Danced by Galante and Leonarda
 Was It Rain?
Music by Lou Handman
Lyrics by Walter Hirsch
Sung by Frances Langford
Love Is Good for Anything That Ails You 
Written by Cliff Friend and Matty Malneck 
Performed by the Tic-Toc Girls, Duke Ellington Orchestra, Eddy Duchin & His Orchestra and Carl Hoff & The Hit Parade Orchestra with chorus
Sweet Heartache
Music by Sam H. Stept
Lyrics by Ned Washington
Sung by Phil Regan and Frances Langford
Hail Alma Mater
Music by Sam H. Stept

References

External links
 

1937 films
American musical films
1937 musical films
Republic Pictures films
Films directed by Gus Meins
American black-and-white films
Films produced by Nat Levine
1930s English-language films
1930s American films